In music, Op. 281 stands for Opus number 281. Compositions that are assigned this number include:

 Milhaud – Symphony No. 4
 Strauss – Vergnügungszug